James Stewart (17 August 1805 – 26 September 1860) was an English politician.	

He was a Member (MP) of Parliament for Honiton in 1837.

References

1805 births
1860 deaths
UK MPs 1837–1841
Members of the Parliament of the United Kingdom for Honiton